Allan Walker (born 3 January 1986) is a former Scottish footballer who played as a midfielder.

Playing career
Walker was born in Edinburgh and began his career at Livingston. He signed on loan for Raith Rovers on 26 October 2007 for one month, then in June 2008 signed for the club permanently. During his time at Raith Rovers, he was part of the side that won the 2008–09 Second Division title.

On 6 June 2013, Walker signed for Scottish League One side Brechin City. Walker spent one season at Glebe Park before moving to East Fife in July 2014, spending eighteen months with the side before signing for Berwick Rangers in January 2016. Walker subsequently left Berwick in September 2016.

Coaching career
Walker was appointed as manager of Syngenta in 2019, but departed the club in 2021.

Honours
Raith Rovers

 Scottish Second Division: 1
 2008–09

References

External links

1986 births
Living people
Footballers from Edinburgh
Association football midfielders
Scottish footballers
Berwick Rangers F.C. players
Brechin City F.C. players
East Fife F.C. players
Hibernian F.C. players
Livingston F.C. players
Raith Rovers F.C. players
Scottish Premier League players
Scottish Football League players
Scottish Professional Football League players